Karl R. Coolidge (March 29, 1890 – March 2, 1964) was an American screenwriter. He wrote for 73 films between 1913 and 1935. He was born in Scranton, Pennsylvania and died in Los Angeles, California.

Selected filmography
 Riders of the Plains (1924)
 The Fast Express (1924)
 Nan of the North (1922)
 The Steel Trail (1923)
 The Moon Riders (1920)
 The Lion Man (1919)
 The Fighting Line (1919)
 The Crow (1919)
 Kingdom Come (1919)
 The Gun Packer (1919)
 Ace High (1919)
 Play Straight or Fight (1918)
 The Mysterious Outlaw (1917)
 Like Wildfire (1917)
 The Spindle of Life (1917)
 The Flame of Youth (1917)

External links

1890 births
1964 deaths
American male screenwriters
20th-century American male writers
20th-century American screenwriters